= ABC logos =

ABC logos may refer to:

- Logos of the American Broadcasting Company
- Logos of the Australian Broadcasting Corporation
